Harold Osborn (1899–1975) was an American athletics competitor

Harold Osborn may also refer to:
 Harold Osborn (cricketer) (1909–1986), New Zealand cricketer
 Harry Osborn, a Marvel Comics character

See also
 Harold S. Osborne (1887–1985), American electrical engineer
 Harry Osborne (disambiguation)